The Duke's Head Hotel is an AA 4 star hotel in the English town of King's Lynn within the county of Norfolk in the United Kingdom. The hotel has been a grade II listed building since 1 December 1951.

Location 
The hotel is situated in the centre of King's Lynn and is on the eastern side of Tuesday Market Place.

History 
The Duke's Head was built in 1683 for the King's Lynn Member of Parliament, Sir John Turner, and is attributed to the King's Lynn architect Henry Bell. Bell designed and built many buildings in King's Lynn and Norfolk including the Customs House in King's Lynn.

Ghostly manifestations 
The Duke's Head is reputed to be one of the most haunted buildings in King's Lynn. It stands on the site of an ancient inn called the Gryffin. There is a red lady who is thought to be a haunting manifestation of a woman who killed herself over her two lovers. There is also a ghostly maid servant who was executed in Tuesday market place for poisoning her mistress.

References 

Buildings and structures completed in 1683
Hotels in King's Lynn and West Norfolk
Hotels in Norfolk
Grade II listed buildings in Norfolk
Hotels established in 1683
Grade II listed hotels
1683 establishments in England